David Norton Edelstein (February 16, 1910 – August 19, 2000) was a United States district judge of the United States District Court for the Southern District of New York from 1951 to 2000 and its Chief Judge from 1971 to 1980.

Education and career

Born in New York City, New York, Edelstein received a Bachelor of Science degree and a Master of Arts degree from Fordham University, and a Bachelor of Laws from Fordham University School of Law. He entered private practice in New York City. He was an attorney in the Claims Division of the United States Department of Justice in 1944. He was an Assistant United States Attorney for the Southern District of New York from 1945 to 1947. He was a Special Assistant to the United States Attorney General of the Lands Division from 1947 to 1948, and an Assistant United States Attorney General of the Customs Division from 1948 to 1951.

Federal judicial service

Edelstein received a recess appointment from President Harry S. Truman on November 1, 1951, to a seat on the United States District Court for the Southern District of New York vacated by Judge Alfred Conkling Coxe Jr. He was nominated to the same position by President Truman on January 30, 1952. He was confirmed by the United States Senate on April 7, 1952, and received his commission on April 8, 1952. He served as Chief Judge from 1971 to 1980. He was a member of the Judicial Conference of the United States from 1971 to 1974. He assumed senior status on November 1, 1994. He was the last federal judge in active service to have been appointed by President Truman. His service terminated on August 19, 2000, due to his death in New York City.

See also
 List of Jewish American jurists
 List of United States federal judges by longevity of service

References

Sources
 
 

1910 births
2000 deaths
Fordham University alumni
Fordham University School of Law alumni
Judges of the United States District Court for the Southern District of New York
United States district court judges appointed by Harry S. Truman
20th-century American judges
20th-century American lawyers
Assistant United States Attorneys